Qarah Dam-e Yek (also Romanized as Qarah Dām-e Yeḵ; also known as Qarah Dām) is a village in Maraveh Tappeh Rural District, in the Central District of Maraveh Tappeh County, Golestan Province, Iran. At the 2006 census, its population was 170, in 36 families.

References 

Populated places in Maraveh Tappeh County